Olle Ljunggren (9 February 1921 – 13 February 2003) was a Swedish middle-distance runner. He finished fourth in the men's 800 metres at the 1948 Summer Olympics.

References

External links
 

1921 births
2003 deaths
Athletes (track and field) at the 1948 Summer Olympics
Swedish male middle-distance runners
Olympic athletes of Sweden
Place of birth missing